David Collier may refer to:

David Collier (sports administrator) (born 1955), English sports administrator
David Collier (political scientist) (born 1942), political scientist
David Collier (cartoonist) (born 1963), Canadian alternative cartoonist
David Collier (footballer) (born 1957), Welsh footballer
Dai Collier (1894–1973), Grimsby Town F.C. and Wales international footballer
David Charles Collier (1871–1934), American real estate developer, civic leader and philanthropist